Anne-Cathrine Herdorf, (born 10 July 1967 in Copenhagen), is a Danish singer and actress who represented Denmark with the group Bandjo at the 1987 Eurovision Song Contest. Performing the song "En lille melodi" ("A little tune" / English recording title: "A Simple Little Song") she finished in 5th place with 83 points.

In 1992 she co-hosted the Danish national final - Dansk Melodi Grand Prix - with another Danish former Eurovision competitor, Anders Frandsen. She appeared at the national final again in 1999 as a jury member and was one of several guest presenters in 2001.

From 1987 to 1993 she played acting roles in several Danish TV productions and from 2001 she has guested or performed as a singer on a number of TV shows.

External links 
 

1967 births
Living people
20th-century Danish women singers
Eurovision Song Contest entrants of 1987
Danish actresses
Eurovision Song Contest entrants for Denmark
Musicians from Copenhagen
21st-century Danish women singers